Boston Spa Academy (formerly Boston Spa Comprehensive School) is a coeducational secondary school for pupils aged 11–19 years old on Clifford Moor Road in Boston Spa, West Yorkshire, England. It is larger than other secondary schools in the area, with 1500 students on roll, including 350 in the sixth form. Boston Spa and neighbouring Wetherby High School have large catchment areas and take pupils from much of north and east Leeds.Over recent years, the proportion of pupils attending Boston Spa Academy from the local areas has significantly increased as the reputation of the school has improved following on from significant improvements in performance. In 2019, Boston Spa was placed in the top 5% of schools nationally and for sixth form was in the highest 250 performing providers in the country.

History
The school developed from the village secondary modern school on High Street. The school opened in 1973. It was made a specialist sports college in 2000, with outside backing from organisations such as Leeds United A.F.C. It has led to partnerships with the Leeds United male and female academies. In 2017 Boston Spa School became Boston Spa Academy. The school's mission statement is summarized by its motto, 'Exceptional, without exception'.

Location and student population
The school community is predominantly White British teens. The largest minority ethnic groups are Indian and Pakistani. 
West Oaks School a Specialist Inclusive Learning Centre, is supported by the school with a base on the school site, enabling positive experiences and opportunities for the students of both schools.

The school was inspected by Ofsted on 9 and 10 May 2012, on the 'no notice' pilot, being notified the day before. 
It was judged to be a Grade 2 'Good school' with good judgements in each of four key areas in achievement, behaviour and safety.

Awards
*In addition to three Specialist Schools and Academies Trust awards for academic achievement the school has been awarded:
Investors in People
Safemark
The Engineering Schools Award
The Football Association National Charter Standard Award
Inclusion Chartermark
The Stephen Lawrence Education Standard

Alumni
 Stephen Booth, cricketer
 Fabian Delph, England international footballer
 Lee Hicken, Film Director
 James Husband, professional footballer
 Simon Johnson, professional footballer
 Matt Jones, Wales international footballer
 Jessica Learmonth Triathlete
 Tom Lees, professional footballer
 Aaron Lennon, England international footballer
 Jonny Maxted, professional footballer
James Milner, England international footballer
 Gavin Strachan, professional footballer
 Jordan Tansey, professional rugby player
 Simon Walton, professional footballer
 Sophie Walton, professional footballer
 Aidy White, professional footballer
 Danny Williams, professional rugby player
 Alex Zane, TV presenter and DJ

References

External links

 EduBase
 Pictures of the school at Flickr
 Boston Spa website

Academies in Leeds
Secondary schools in Leeds
 
Educational institutions established in 1973
1973 establishments in England